André Rudersdorf (born 9 September 1995 in Hadamar) is a German racing driver. In 2013 he started in the FIA European Formula Three Championship series.

Career 
Rudersdorf began his racing career in karting in 2003. He remained in karting until 2010. In 2011 he began his formula racing career. He competed in the ADAC Formel Masters and concluded the season in 19th position in the championship. In 2012 Rudersdorf got a cockpit at ma-con in the German Formula Three Championship. He competed in an older-spec car and therefore he was eligible for the trophy standing. In this class he won 14 of 21 races and reached the trophy championship. Furthermore, he started in the Austrian Formula Three Championship. He won 7 of 14 races and won the championship with 212 to 185 points in front of Sandro Zeller.

In 2013 Rudersdorf stayed at ma-con and switched to the FIA European Formula Three Championship.

Career summary 
2003–2010: Karting

Auto racing career summary
{|
|

References

External links 

1995 births
Living people
German racing drivers
ADAC Formel Masters drivers
German Formula Three Championship drivers
FIA Formula 3 European Championship drivers
Austrian Formula Three Championship drivers
Ma-con Motorsport drivers